Frank Scott Hogg (July 26, 1904 – January 1, 1951) was a Canadian astronomer.  Hogg was born in Preston, Ontario to Dr. James Scott Hogg and Ida Barberon. After earning an undergraduate degree from the University of Toronto, Hogg received the second doctorate in astronomy awarded at Harvard University in 1929 where he pioneered in the study of spectrophotometry of stars and of spectra of comets. His supervisor there was Cecilia Payne-Gaposchkin. During World War II, he developed a two-star sextant for air navigation.  He was the head of the Department of Astronomy at the University of Toronto and director of the David Dunlap Observatory from 1946 until his death. During this time he pursued the observatory's major research program to study the motions of faint stars in the line of sight. He was married to fellow astronomer Helen Sawyer Hogg from 1930 until his death from a heart attack in 1951. The crater Hogg on the moon is co-named for him and Arthur Robert Hogg.

Notes

External links
 

Frank Scott Hogg archival papers held at the University of Toronto Archives and Records Management Services

1904 births
1951 deaths
20th-century Canadian astronomers
University of Toronto alumni
Harvard University alumni
People from Cambridge, Ontario
Academic staff of the University of Toronto
Canadian people of Scottish descent